Burr Clark "B. C." Chamberlain (August 21, 1877 – November 11, 1933) was an American college football player and coach. He played college football at Yale University from 1896 to 1898 at the center and tackle positions. Three times he was an All-American. Chamberlain served as the head football for one season at Stanford University in 1899 and for a season at the United States Naval Academy in 1903 season, compiling a career head coaching record of 6–12–3. He also coached football at the United States Military Academy, the University of Virginia, and his alma mater, Yale.

Chamberlain was born  on August 21, 1877, in Dalton, Massachusetts. He died of a heart attack, at his home in Bronxville, New York, on November 11, 1933.

Head coaching record

References

1877 births
1933 deaths
19th-century players of American football
American football centers
American football tackles
Army Black Knights football coaches
Navy Midshipmen football coaches
Stanford Cardinal football coaches
Virginia Cavaliers football coaches
Yale Bulldogs football coaches
Yale Bulldogs football players
All-American college football players
Phillips Academy alumni
People from Dalton, Massachusetts
Players of American football from Massachusetts
Sportspeople from Berkshire County, Massachusetts